Gniezno railway station is a railway station serving the city of Gniezno, in the Greater Poland Voivodeship, Poland. The station is located on the Poznań–Skandawa railway and Oleśnica–Chojnice railway. The train services are operated by PKP, Przewozy Regionalne and Koleje Wielkopolskie.

History
The history of the railway station in Gniezno started on 30 November 1867 when, as a result of intense negotiations, a contract to build a railway from Poznan by Gniezno and Inowrocław to Torun and Bydgoszcz was signed. The railway station in Gniezno was one of the most important on the route to Bydgoszcz and Torun. Once the decision had been made and the optimal route had been studied, the first excavations were recorded in September 1868, at the area of the current railway station in Trzemeszno.

After four years of construction of the line, the grand opening of the station took place on 26 May 1872, when the first train ran on the new line. The first passenger service was inaugurated on 1 July 1873. The construction of a second railway line connecting Gniezno with Oleśnica was approved on 17 June 1872 with the official opening on 30 June 1875.

Gniezno railway station is located at the 50th kilometer mark on the line from Poznan to Torun, on the south side of the city of Gniezno. The most important building opposite the station has become a powerful addition to the expansion of the railway station, a depot. The locomotive depot has been  rebuilt several times and it has now become a roundhouse, one of Europe's largest with 24 roads coming from it. Nowadays it is open for tourists.

In the years 1908 to 1911, as a result of numerous transformations both in the late nineteenth and early twentieth century, the technical and operational activity at the station expanded.

With the outbreak of World War II, the city of Gniezno was engaged in the raids. In September 1939 the railway lines were damaged or destroyed. On 6 September, as a result of the bombing, the roundhouse and several steam locomotives were destroyed. In 1940, as a result of the meeting of the Special Committee approved the plan "Otto", which aimed at the restoration and reconstruction of railways, modernization and expansion of railway stations and in the case of Gniezno modernization and expansion of the roundhouse. Thanks to the program, "Otto" in addition to the expansion and modernisation of railway lines and the construction of footbridges and roundhouse roads, telecommunication installations, reconstruction and electrification of railway sidings and the depot.

But the same program "Otto" did not finish there as the freight yard at Gniezo was expanded to relieve Poznan. The history of the railway station and roundhouse was written in 2010 in the book Miron Urbaniak Fri. "The historic railway station Gniezno" and the book of Thomas Tomkowiak Fri. "Secrets of Gniezno".

Modernisation

In 1967-1968 the station was modernised with new platforms. Between 2012 and 2014, the station had a complete modernisation and reconstruction of the current station building and surrounding areas.

Train services
The station is served by the following service(s):

EuroCity services (EC) (EC 95 by DB) (IC by PKP) Berlin - Frankfurt (Oder) - Rzepin - Poznan - Bydgoszcz - Gdansk - Gdynia
Intercity services Wroclaw - Leszno - Poznan - Inowroclaw - Bydgoszcz - Gdansk - Gdynia
Intercity services Krakow - Lodz - Kutno - Konin - Poznan - Inowroclaw - Bydgoszcz
Intercity services Wroclaw - Leszno - Poznan - Inowroclaw - Bydgoszcz - Gdansk - Gdynia
Intercity services Wroclaw - Leszno - Poznan - Inowroclaw - Torun - Olsztyn - Bialystok
Intercity services Zielona Góra - Zbąszynek - Poznan - Inowroclaw - Bydgoszcz - Gdansk - Gdynia
Intercity services Zielona Góra - Zbąszynek - Poznan - Inowroclaw - Torun - Olsztyn
Intercity services Jelenia Gora - Wroclaw - Jarocin - Poznan - Inowroclaw - Bydgoszcz - Gdansk - Gdynia
Regional services (R) Poznan - Gniezno - Mogilno - Inowroclaw - Bydgoszcz
Regional services (R) Poznan - Gniezno - Mogilno - Inowroclaw - Torun
Regional services (KW) Poznan - Gniezno
Regional services (KW) Gniezno - Krotoszyn

References

 This article is based upon a translation of the Polish language version as of April 2016.

External links
 

Railway stations in Poland opened in 1872
Railway stations in Greater Poland Voivodeship
Railway stations served by Przewozy Regionalne InterRegio